Mount Clark is a  granite peak in the Clark Range, a sub-range of the Sierra Nevada. It is a popular destination for mountaineers.

Both the mountain and the range are named in honor of Galen Clark, an early explorer and the first guardian of Yosemite National Park. It was summited in 1866 by Clarence King and James Gardener of the US Geological Survey. Before it received its present name, it was known as Gothic Peak and then The Obelisk, the name used by the Whitney Survey. Obelisk Lake, at  lies on the mountain's northeast flank.

Climate
Mount Clark is located in an alpine climate zone. Most weather fronts originate in the Pacific Ocean, and travel east toward the Sierra Nevada mountains. As fronts approach, they are forced upward by the peaks (orographic lift), causing them to drop their moisture in the form of rain or snowfall onto the range.

Gallery

See also
 
 Geology of the Yosemite area

References

External links 
 
 

Mountains of Yosemite National Park
Mountains of Mariposa County, California
North American 3000 m summits
Mountains of Northern California
Sierra Nevada (United States)